Karen Ingenthron (born April 16, 1945 in Philadelphia, Pennsylvania) is an American author, actress, and radio commentator.

Biography
She was born April 16, 1945 in Philadelphia and she graduated from the University of California, Berkeley with a B.A. in Dramatic Art. She later performed at the Boulder Shakespeare Festival, the American Conservatory Theater, the Magic Theater, and the Actors Repertory Theater. She was a founding member of the Berkeley Repertory Theatre, where she acted in over 50 plays.

In 1979, Ingenthron moved to New York City and appeared in a North Carolina dinner theater production of California Suite with Al Lewis. She moved to Los Angeles, where she stayed for three years, and had a role on an episode of the television series Lou Grant in 1980. Returning to New York, she married Al Lewis in 1984. After receiving an MA at Hunter College, she taught play writing at the Roosevelt Island Cultural Center for five years. In 1987, Ingenthron teamed with Gloria W. Milliken to create Eviction Intervention Services, a not-for-profit homelessness prevention agency. In 1997, she was named executive director.

Radio show
WBAI, a Pacifica Network FM radio station in New York City, invited Al Lewis to create a show with Ingenthron's co-producing. In 2003, Lewis was too ill to do his show, and she took over as the host. In 2006, she received the Sister Sarah Clarke Human Rights Award.

Filmography
 Lou Grant, episode "Censored" (1980), as Irene Teel
 Alabama's Ghost (1973)
 Godmonster of Indian Flats (1973) as Mariposa

References

External links

1945 births
Living people
American stage actresses
American radio personalities
University of California, Berkeley alumni
20th-century American actresses
Hunter College alumni
Actresses from Philadelphia
21st-century American women